Liu Yun (born March 6, 1982, in Hefei, Anhui) is a Chinese handball player who competed at the 2004 Summer Olympics.

In 2004, she finished eighth with the Chinese team in the women's competition. She played all seven matches and scored seven goals.

External links
Profile 

1982 births
Living people
Handball players at the 2004 Summer Olympics
Handball players at the 2008 Summer Olympics
Olympic handball players of China
Chinese female handball players
People from Hefei
Sportspeople from Anhui
Asian Games medalists in handball
Handball players at the 2002 Asian Games
Handball players at the 2006 Asian Games
Asian Games bronze medalists for China
Medalists at the 2002 Asian Games